Design Your Universe is the fourth full-length studio album by Dutch symphonic metal band Epica, released on 16 October 2009. It was the first album to feature officially new band members Isaac Delahaye on guitar and Ariën van Weesenbeek on drums.

A Gold Edition re-release of the album was released on 4 October 2019.

Overview

Pre-release and production
The band entered Gate Studio in Wolfsburg, Germany on 2 March 2009 to start recording the album with usual collaborators Sascha Paeth, Amanda Somerville and Michael 'Miro' Rodenberg.

The band's previous album, The Divine Conspiracy, was dealing with the idea that God created many religions and that it was to man to understand that they are all the same, and this album will be dealing with the power of thoughts and imaginations, as Mark Jansen stated:

Three songs of this album continue the A New Age Dawns saga, which started on the album Consign to Oblivion of 2005.

Sonata Arctica frontman Tony Kakko announced in an interview with La Grosse Radio.com that he would duet with Simone Simons on the album. His vocals for the song "White Waters" were recorded in Finland and later mixed with the other sound tracks.

The song "Resign to Surrender" was published on the MySpace website of the record label Nuclear Blast on 23 September 2009. and the video for "Unleashed" premiered on the band's MySpace site on 25 September 2009.

The bonus track "Incentive" is one of the very few Epica songs to not feature Simone Simons in any capacity.

Reception

Reception has been positive from both critics and fans. The album debuted at No. 8 in the Dutch charts, being the highest position an Epica album had reached until that moment. The album remained on the chart for five weeks, and re-entered in No. 94 for one week due to the band's performance at the 2010 Pinkpop Festival.

Design Your Universe World Tour

After the release of Design Your Universe, Epica set out on a World Tour to support the album. They did a CD release party at The Paradiso in Amsterdam. They performed at some summer festival concerts in the summer of 2010 and returned to the United States and Canada in late fall 2010. Several dates in Europe, specially in the Netherlands, were sold out. The band also did a South American Tour, performing in  Colombia, Brazil, Argentina, Chile, Peru, Bolivia and Uruguay. They played also in many important rock and metal festivals in Europe, such as Wacken Open Air, Pinkpop and Masters of Rock, in front of very large audiences.

Track listing

Personnel
Credits for Design Your Universe adapted from liner notes.

Epica
Simone Simons – lead vocals, photography
Mark Jansen – rhythm guitar, grunts, screams, orchestral arrangements, mixing
Isaac Delahaye – lead guitar, engineering
Yves Huts – bass guitar, engineering, orchestral arrangements on "Deconstruct"
Coen Janssen – synthesizer, piano, orchestral, choir arrangements, choir vocals
Ariën van Weesenbeek – drums, grunts, spoken word

Additional personnel
Tony Kakko – clean male vocals on "White Waters"
Amanda Somerville – soprano vocals on "Unleashed (Duet Version)", backing vocals, vocals production, engineering, vocal coaching, lyrical editing, choir vocals
Brian Reese – orchestral arrangements (on "Tides of Time")

Epica Choir
Bridget Fogle, Cloudy Yang, Linda van Summeren, Melvin Edmondsen, Previn Moore

Production
 Gjalt Lucassen – Latin translation
 Jaap Toorenaar – Latin translation
Sascha Paeth – engineering, mixing, backing vocals
Simon Oberender – engineering, editing, choir vocals
Olaf Reitmeier – engineering, editing, choir vocals
Joost van den Broek – engineering
Miro Rodenberg – mastering, orchestral arrangements
Stefan Heilemann – artwork, cover art, art direction, design, photography

Charts

References

2009 albums
Epica (band) albums
Nuclear Blast albums